The Belgian Third Division winners were winners of the third-highest level in Belgian football. The third division was established in 1926 with three leagues of 14 clubs each as the Promotion. In 1931, a fourth league was added. From 1948 on, a play-off is introduced to determine the Promotion champion. In 1952 the Belgian league system was changed and the Promotion became the Third Division with 2 leagues of 16 teams each. A play-off was introduced in 1993 in order to determine a third team to qualify for the second division. From 1998 on, the play-off to determine the third division champion was played no more. In 2016 the Third Division was rebranded and restructured to become Belgian First Amateur Division.

Promotion A, Promotion B and Promotion C (1926-1931)

Promotion A, Promotion B, Promotion C and Promotion D (1931-1952)

Third division A and Third division B (1952-1998)

 — The result of the final game is unknown (the team shown under champion is the winner of the third division A and the team shown under runner-up is the winner of the third division B).  
 — No final game was played (the team shown under champion is the winner of the third division A and the team shown under runner-up is the winner of the third division B). 
 — Following the fusion between R Daring Club Molenbeek (second division) and R Racing White (first division), KV Kortrijk (second-placed team of the third division B) had promoted to the second division after a play-off game against Waterschei SV Thor Genka (second-placed team of the third division A). 
 — Following the increase from 16 to 20 clubs in the first division, 3 extra clubs were promoted to the second division: R Tilleur FC (2nd in the third division A), RAEC Mons (2nd in the third division B) and AA La Louvière (3rd in the third division B). 
 — Following the merger between Standard Liège and RFC Sérésien (both playing in the first division), RU Saint-Gilloise (2nd in the third division A and play-off finalist) also promoted.

Third division A and Third division B (1998-2016)

 — Due to financial problems, KV Kortrijk did not promote, allowing play-off finalist RCS Visétois to be promoted instead.

References